Hower-Slote House, also known as the Fort Freeland House, is a historic home located at Lewis Township, Northumberland County, Pennsylvania.  It was built about 1845, and is a -story, five bay by two bay, rectangular brick dwelling in the Germanic style.  It measures 40 feet by 28 feet, and has a gable roof.  The house is sites on the location of the American Revolutionary War Fort Freeland.  It was also the site of grist and sawmills (1772), a fulling mill (1806), and later commercial enterprises.

It was added to the National Register of Historic Places in 1979.

References

External links
Warrior Run-Fort Freeland Heritage Society website

Houses on the National Register of Historic Places in Pennsylvania
Houses completed in 1845
Houses in Northumberland County, Pennsylvania
National Register of Historic Places in Northumberland County, Pennsylvania